Wilsonia may refer to:
Wilsonia (bird), a genus of birds
Wilsonia (plant), a genus of plants
Wilsonia (ant), an extinct genus of ants
Wilsonia, California, a census-designated place
Wilsonia Historic District, an historic district in California